Pedro Elsa (born 28 October 1901, date of death unknown) was an Argentine athlete. He competed in the men's shot put and the men's discus throw at the 1932 Summer Olympics.

References

1901 births
Year of death missing
Athletes (track and field) at the 1932 Summer Olympics
Argentine male shot putters
Argentine male discus throwers
Olympic athletes of Argentina
Place of birth missing